Te Uira is an  who personifies lightning in Māori mythology. Te Uira's child Te Kanapu, grandparent of Whaitiri, is also a personification of lightning.

See also 
 Tāwhaki
 Tāwhirimātea

References 

Māori gods
Thunder gods